Sellheim may refer to:

People
 Gert Sellheim, a German-Australian artist
 Hugo Sellheim, a pioneering physician in the field of gynecology and obstetrics
 Katharina Sellheim, born 1976, German pianist and academic
 Konstantin Sellheim, born 1978, German violist and academic
 Philip Frederic Sellheim, a pastoralist and mining official in Queensland, Australia
 Victor Sellheim, an  Australian military officer during the Second Boer War and World War I

Places
 Sellheim, Queensland, a town in the Charters Towers Region, Queensland, Australia